Vitaliano Visconti Borromeo or Vitalianus Visconti Borromeo (1591–1617) was a Roman Catholic prelate who served as Titular Archbishop of Hadrianopolis in Haemimonto (1616–1617) and Apostolic Nuncio to Emperor (1616–1617).

Biography
Vitaliano Visconti Borromeo was born in Milan, Italy in 1591.
On 4 July 1616, he was appointed during the papacy of Pope Paul V as Titular Archbishop of Hadrianopolis in Haemimonto.
On 14 August 1616, he was consecrated bishop by Giambattista Leni, Bishop of Ferrara, with Galeazzo Sanvitale, Archbishop Emeritus of Bari-Canosa, and Ulpiano Volpi, Archbishop Emeritus of Chieti, serving as co-consecrators. 
On 25 August 1616, he was appointed during the papacy of Pope Paul V as Apostolic Nuncio to Emperor.
He served as Titular Archbishop of Hadrianopolis in Haemimonto and Apostolic Nuncio to Emperor until his death in May 1617.

References

External links and additional sources
 (for Chronology of Bishops) 
 (for Chronology of Bishops) 
 (for Chronology of Bishops) 

17th-century Roman Catholic titular bishops
Bishops appointed by Pope Paul V
1591 births
1617 deaths
Apostolic Nuncios to the Holy Roman Empire